The Canton of Épernon is an administrative division of the Eure-et-Loir department, Centre-Val de Loire, France. It was created at the French canton reorganisation which came into effect in March 2015. Its prefecture is Épernon.

It consists of the following communes:
 
Bouglainval
Chartainvilliers
Coulombs
Droue-sur-Drouette
Épernon
Faverolles
Gas
Hanches
Houx
Lormaye
Maintenon
Mévoisins
Néron
Nogent-le-Roi
Pierres
Les Pinthières
Saint-Laurent-la-Gâtine
Saint-Lucien
Saint-Martin-de-Nigelles
Saint-Piat
Senantes
Soulaires
Villiers-le-Morhier

References

Cantons of Eure-et-Loir